The 2011–12 Basketball Championship of Bosnia and Herzegovina is the 11th season of the Basketball Championship of Bosnia and Herzegovina, with 13 teams from Bosnia participating in it.

Regular season will start on October 15, 2011, and it will last until March 17, 2012.

2011-12 teams

Basketball Championship of Bosnia and Herzegovina
Bosnia
Basketball